The 1953 French Championships (now known as the French Open) was a tennis tournament that took place on the outdoor clay courts at the Stade Roland-Garros in Paris, France. The tournament ran from 20 May until 31 May. It was the 57th staging of the French Championships, and the second Grand Slam tennis event of 1953. Ken Rosewall and Maureen Connolly won the singles titles.

Finals

Men's singles 

 Ken Rosewall defeated  Vic Seixas 6–3, 6–4, 1–6, 6–2

Women's singles 

 Maureen Connolly defeated  Doris Hart  6–2, 6–4

Men's doubles

 Lew Hoad /  Ken Rosewall  defeated  Mervyn Rose /  Clive Wilderspin  6–2, 6–1, 6–1

Women's doubles

 Shirley Fry /  Doris Hart defeated  Maureen Connolly /  Julia Sampson 6–4, 6–3

Mixed doubles

 Doris Hart /  Vic Seixas defeated  Maureen Connolly /  Mervyn Rose  4–6, 6–4, 6–0

References

External links
 French Open official website

French Championships
1953
French Championships (tennis)
French Championships (tennis)
French Championships (tennis)